In statistics, reification is the use of an idealized model of a statistical process. The model is then used to make inferences connecting model results, which imperfectly represent the actual process, with experimental observations.

Also,  a process whereby model-derived quantities such as principal components, factors  and latent variables are identified, named and treated as if they were directly measurable quantities.

Notes

References 
 Everitt, B.S. (2002) Cambridge Dictionary of Statistics (2nd Edition), CUP. 

Multivariate statistics
Statistical models